The 2002–03 Edmonton Oilers season was the Oilers' 24th season in the NHL, and they were coming off a 38–28–12–4 record in 2001–02, earning 92 points, however, they missed the playoffs for the first time since 1996, finishing in 9th place in the Western Conference.

The Oilers got off to a slow start, winning only 1 of their first 7 games, going 1–4–2, however, the club turned around the tough start and move above the .500 mark on November 25 and never go below again for the remainder of the season. As the trade deadline approached in mid-March, and the club comfortably in a playoff position, Edmonton made a couple of deals, trading defenceman Janne Niinimaa and a second-round draft pick in the 2003 NHL Entry Draft to the New York Islanders in exchange for Brad Isbister and prospect Raffi Torres. The Oilers also traded Anson Carter and Aleš Píša to the New York Rangers for Radek Dvořák and Cory Cross. Edmonton finished the season with a 36–26–11–9 record, earning 92 points, the same amount as the previous season, and clinch the final playoff spot in the Western Conference.

Offensively, Ryan Smyth led the club with 27 goals and 61 points, while Todd Marchant had a breakout season, earning 40 assists and 60 points. Anson Carter had 25 goals and 55 points in 68 games before being dealt to the New York Rangers. Mike York and Mike Comrie each broke the 20 goal plateau, with 22 and 20 goals respectively. Eric Brewer led the Oilers defense with eight goals and 29 points, while Scott Ferguson had a team high 120 penalty minutes.

In goal, Tommy Salo once again got a majority of the playing time, winning 29 games, while posting a 2.71 goals against average (GAA) and earning four shutouts. Backup Jussi Markkanen had a very solid season, winning seven games, had a team-high 2.59 GAA and posted three shutouts.

The Oilers finished first overall in the NHL in short-handed goals scored, with 13.

After a year of absence, Edmonton returned to the post-season and would face their old rivals, the Dallas Stars, who finished with 111 points in the regular season. This was the sixth playoff meeting between the clubs in the past seven years, with Dallas winning four series in a row. Edmonton started the series on the right note, defeating the Stars 2–1 on the road. Dallas, however, routed the Oilers in Game 2 to even the series as it shifted to Edmonton  The Oilers took a 2–1 series lead with a solid 3–2 victory in Game 3, but Dallas rebound in Game 4 to tie the series up at two games apiece. The Stars took control of the series, winning Game 5, 5–2, and end the series in Game 6, beating Edmonton 3–2, thereby eliminating the Oilers for the fifth time in the past six seasons.

Season standings

Schedule and results

Regular season

|-  style="text-align:center; background:white;"
| 1 || October 10 || Philadelphia Flyers || 2–2 || Edmonton Oilers || OT || Salo || 16,839 || 0–0–1–0 || 1 || 
|-  style="text-align:center; background:#cfc;"
| 2 || October 12 || Edmonton Oilers || 3–2 || Nashville Predators || || Salo || 17,113 || 1–0–1–0 || 3 || 
|-  style="text-align:center; background:#fbb;"
| 3 || October 15 || Edmonton Oilers || 0–3 || Dallas Stars || || Salo || 18,532 || 1–1–1–0 || 3 || 
|-  style="text-align:center; background:#fbb;"
| 4 || October 17 || Edmonton Oilers || 3–4 || San Jose Sharks || || Salo || 17,017 || 1–2–1–0 || 3 || 
|-  style="text-align:center; background:#fbb;"
| 5 || October 19 || Boston Bruins || 4–3 || Edmonton Oilers || || Salo || 16,839 || 1–3–1–0 || 3 || 
|-  style="text-align:center; background:white;"
| 6 || October 22 || Edmonton Oilers || 3–3 || Colorado Avalanche || OT || Salo || 18,007 || 1–3–2–0 || 4 || 
|-  style="text-align:center; background:#fbb;"
| 7 || October 24 || St. Louis Blues || 2–1 || Edmonton Oilers || || Markkanen || 16,033 || 1–4–2–0 || 4 ||  
|-  style="text-align:center; background:#cfc;"
| 8 || October 26 || Mighty Ducks of Anaheim || 3–4 || Edmonton Oilers || || Markkanen || 16,357 || 2–4–2–0 || 6 ||  
|-  style="text-align:center; background:#ffb;"
| 9 || October 28 || Dallas Stars || 4–3 || Edmonton Oilers || OT || Markkanen || 16,260 || 2–4–2–1 || 7 || 
|-

|-  style="text-align:center; background:white;"
| 10 || November 1 || Buffalo Sabres || 1–1 || Edmonton Oilers || OT || Salo || 16,201 || 2–4–3–1 || 8 || 
|-  style="text-align:center; background:#cfc;"
| 11 || November 3 || Edmonton Oilers || 4–1 || Chicago Blackhawks || || Salo || 12,531 || 3–4–3–1 || 10 || 
|-  style="text-align:center; background:#fbb;"
| 12 || November 5 || Edmonton Oilers || 2–5 || New York Rangers || || Salo || 18,086 || 3–5–3–1 || 10 || 
|-  style="text-align:center; background:#fbb;"
| 13 || November 8 || Edmonton Oilers || 2–4 || New York Islanders || || Salo || 14,093 || 3–6–3–1 || 10 || 
|-  style="text-align:center; background:#cfc;"
| 14 || November 9 || Edmonton Oilers || 6–3 || New Jersey Devils || || Markkanen || 15,095 || 4–6–3–1 || 12 || 
|-  style="text-align:center; background:#fbb;"
| 15 || November 11 || Edmonton Oilers || 1–6 || Boston Bruins || || Markkanen || 11,123 || 4–7–3–1 || 12 || 
|-  style="text-align:center; background:#cfc;"
| 16 || November 12 || Edmonton Oilers || 3–2 || Minnesota Wild || || Salo || 18,064 || 5–7–3–1 || 14 || 
|-  style="text-align:center; background:#cfc;"
| 17 || November 15 || St. Louis Blues || 0–5 || Edmonton Oilers || || Salo || 16,301 || 6–7–3–1 || 16 || 
|-  style="text-align:center; background:#fbb;"
| 18 || November 16 || Los Angeles Kings || 4–1 || Edmonton Oilers || || Salo || 16,461 || 6–8–3–1 || 16 || 
|-  style="text-align:center; background:#cfc;"
| 19 || November 19 || Chicago Blackhawks || 1–3 || Edmonton Oilers || || Salo || 16,033 || 7–8–3–1 || 18 || 
|-  style="text-align:center; background:#cfc;"
| 20 || November 21 || Edmonton Oilers || 3–1 || Calgary Flames || || Salo || 17,660 || 8–8–3–1 || 20 || 
|-  style="text-align:center; background:white;"
| 21 || November 23 || Detroit Red Wings || 1–1 || Edmonton Oilers || OT || Salo || 16,839 || 8–8–4–1 || 21 || 
|-  style="text-align:center; background:#cfc;"
| 22 || November 25 || Edmonton Oilers || 5–4 || Detroit Red Wings || OT || Markkanen || 20,058 || 9–8–4–1 || 23 || 
|-  style="text-align:center; background:#cfc;"
| 23 || November 27 || Edmonton Oilers || 3–1 || Columbus Blue Jackets || || Salo || 17,745 || 10–8–4–1 || 25 || 
|-  style="text-align:center; background:#cfc;"
| 24 || November 30 || Colorado Avalanche || 0–1 || Edmonton Oilers || || Salo || 16,839 || 11–8–4–1 || 27 || 
|-

|-  style="text-align:center; background:#cfc;"
| 25 || December 3 || Minnesota Wild || 1–2 || Edmonton Oilers || OT || Salo || 15,527 || 12–8–4–1 || 29 || 
|-  style="text-align:center; background:#fbb;"
| 26 || December 5 || Edmonton Oilers || 2–3 || Tampa Bay Lightning || || Salo || 13,454 || 12–9–4–1 || 29 || 
|-  style="text-align:center; background:#cfc;"
| 27 || December 7 || Edmonton Oilers || 4–0 || Florida Panthers || || Markkanen || 14,144 || 13–9–4–1 || 31 || 
|-  style="text-align:center; background:#cfc;"
| 28 || December 8 || Edmonton Oilers || 3–0 || Atlanta Thrashers || || Salo || 12,179 || 14–9–4–1 || 33 || 
|-  style="text-align:center; background:#cfc;"
| 29 || December 11 || Carolina Hurricanes || 1–4 || Edmonton Oilers || || Salo || 16,091 || 15–9–4–1 || 35 || 
|-  style="text-align:center; background:#cfc;"
| 30 || December 13 || Colorado Avalanche || 3–4 || Edmonton Oilers || OT || Salo || 16,839 || 16–9–4–1 || 37 || 
|-  style="text-align:center; background:#fbb;"
| 31 || December 14 || Vancouver Canucks || 6–3 || Edmonton Oilers || || Salo || 16,839 || 16–10–4–1 || 37 || 
|-  style="text-align:center; background:#ffb;"
| 32 || December 17 || Edmonton Oilers || 3–4 || Minnesota Wild || OT || Markkanen || 18,568 || 16–10–4–2 || 38 || 
|-  style="text-align:center; background:#fbb;"
| 33 || December 19 || Edmonton Oilers || 1–2 || Colorado Avalanche || || Salo ||| 18,007 || 16–11–4–2 || 38 || 
|-  style="text-align:center; background:#ffb;"
| 34 || December 21 || Edmonton Oilers || 3–4 || Vancouver Canucks || OT || Salo || 18,422 || 16–11–4–3 || 39 || 
|-  style="text-align:center; background:#fbb;"
| 35 || December 26 || Vancouver Canucks || 4–2 || Edmonton Oilers || || Salo || 16,839 || 16–12–4–3 || 39 || 
|-  style="text-align:center; background:#cfc;"
| 36 || December 28 || Toronto Maple Leafs || 2–3 || Edmonton Oilers || OT || Salo || 16,839 || 17–12–4–3 || 41 || 
|-  style="text-align:center; background:#ffb;"
| 37 || December 30 || Edmonton Oilers || 3–4 || Phoenix Coyotes || OT || Salo || 15,589 || 17–12–4–4 || 42 || 
|-  style="text-align:center; background:#fbb;"
| 38 || December 31 || Edmonton Oilers || 1–4 || Dallas Stars || || Markkanen || 18,532 || 17–13–4–4 || 42 || 
|-

|-  style="text-align:center; background:#ffb;"
| 39 || January 2 || Minnesota Wild || 2–1 || Edmonton Oilers || OT || Salo || 16,839 || 17–13–4–5 || 43 || 
|-  style="text-align:center; background:#cfc;"
| 40 || January 4 || Montreal Canadiens || 4–5 || Edmonton Oilers || OT || Salo || 16,839 || 18–13–4–5 || 45 || 
|-  style="text-align:center; background:white;"
| 41 || January 6 || Edmonton Oilers || 5–5 || San Jose Sharks || OT || Salo || 16,648 || 18–13–5–5 || 46 || 
|-  style="text-align:center; background:#cfc;"
| 42 || January 8 || Edmonton Oilers || 1–0 || Mighty Ducks of Anaheim || || Markkanen || 12,390 || 19–13–5–5 || 48 || 
|-  style="text-align:center; background:#cfc;"
| 43 || January 9 || Edmonton Oilers || 5–4 || Los Angeles Kings || || Salo || 15,783 || 20–13–5–5 || 50 || 
|-  style="text-align:center; background:#fbb;"
| 44 || January 11 || Ottawa Senators || 2–0 || Edmonton Oilers || || Salo || 16,839 || 20–14–5–5 || 50 || 
|-  style="text-align:center; background:#cfc;"
| 45 || January 13 || Columbus Blue Jackets || 5–8 || Edmonton Oilers || || Salo || 16,057 || 21–14–5–5 || 52 || 
|-  style="text-align:center; background:#cfc;"
| 46 || January 16 || Los Angeles Kings || 0–2 || Edmonton Oilers || || Salo || 16,839 || 22–14–5–5 || 54 || 
|-  style="text-align:center; background:#ffb;"
| 47 || January 18 || Nashville Predators || 3–2 || Edmonton Oilers || OT || Markkanen || 16,839 || 22–14–5–6 || 55 || 
|-  style="text-align:center; background:#fbb;"
| 48 || January 20 || Edmonton Oilers || 3–4 || Calgary Flames || || Salo || 17,832 || 22–15–5–6 || 55 || 
|-  style="text-align:center; background:#cfc;"
| 49 || January 22 || Detroit Red Wings || 3–4 || Edmonton Oilers || OT || Markkanen || 16,839 || 23–15–5–6 || 57 || 
|-  style="text-align:center; background:#fbb;"
| 50 || January 24 || Phoenix Coyotes || 5–1 || Edmonton Oilers || || Salo || 16,839 || 23–16–5–6 || 57 || 
|-  style="text-align:center; background:#cfc;"
| 51 || January 29 || Minnesota Wild || 1–5 || Edmonton Oilers || || Salo || 16,469 || 24–16–5–6 || 59 || 
|-  style="text-align:center; background:white;"
| 52 || January 30 || Edmonton Oilers || 3–3 || Vancouver Canucks || OT || Salo || 18,422 || 24–16–6–6 || 60 || 
|-

|-  style="text-align:center; background:#cfc;"
| 53 || February 5 || Mighty Ducks of Anaheim || 1–2 || Edmonton Oilers || || Salo || 16,839 || 25–16–6–6 || 62 || 
|-  style="text-align:center; background:#fbb;"
| 54 || February 7 || Calgary Flames || 4–3 || Edmonton Oilers || || Markkanen || 16,839 || 25–17–6–6 || 62 || 
|-  style="text-align:center; background:#fbb;"
| 55 || February 8 || Chicago Blackhawks || 3–0 || Edmonton Oilers || || Salo || 16,839 || 25–18–6–6 || 62 || 
|-  style="text-align:center; background:#cfc;"
| 56 || February 11 || Edmonton Oilers || 5–4 || Toronto Maple Leafs || || Salo || 19,399 || 26–18–6–6 || 64 || 
|-  style="text-align:center; background:#fbb;"
| 57 || February 13 || Edmonton Oilers || 0–2 || Ottawa Senators || || Salo || 18,115 || 26–19–6–6 || 64 || 
|-  style="text-align:center; background:#fbb;"
| 58 || February 15 || Edmonton Oilers || 2–3 || Montreal Canadiens || || Salo || 21,273 || 26–20–6–6 || 64 || 
|-  style="text-align:center; background:#ffb;"
| 59 || February 18 || Edmonton Oilers || 3–4 || Pittsburgh Penguins || OT || Salo || 13,552 || 26–20–6–7 || 65 || 
|-  style="text-align:center; background:#fbb;"
| 60 || February 20 || Edmonton Oilers || 2–6 || Detroit Red Wings || || Salo || 20,058 || 26–21–6–7 || 65 || 
|-  style="text-align:center; background:#ffb;"
| 61 || February 22 || Vancouver Canucks || 3–2 || Edmonton Oilers || OT || Salo || 16,839 || 26–21–6–8 || 66 || 
|-  style="text-align:center; background:white;"
| 62 || February 23 || Atlanta Thrashers || 3–3 || Edmonton Oilers || OT || Salo || 16,839 || 26–21–7–8 || 67 || 
|-  style="text-align:center; background:#fbb;"
| 63 || February 25 || Edmonton Oilers || 2–4 || Colorado Avalanche || || Salo || 18,007 || 26–22–7–8 || 67 || 
|-  style="text-align:center; background:#fbb;"
| 64 || February 27 || Edmonton Oilers || 1–4 || St. Louis Blues || || Markkanen || 19,255 || 26–23–7–8 || 67 || 
|-

|-  style="text-align:center; background:white;"
| 65 || March 1 || Edmonton Oilers || 3–3 || Columbus Blue Jackets || OT || Markkanen || 18,136 || 26–23–8–8 || 68 || 
|-  style="text-align:center; background:#cfc;"
| 66 || March 4 || San Jose Sharks || 1–2 || Edmonton Oilers || || Salo || 16,839 || 27–23–8–8 || 70 || 
|-  style="text-align:center; background:#cfc;"
| 67 || March 6 || Edmonton Oilers || 2–1 || Los Angeles Kings || || Salo || 18,118 || 28–23–8–8 || 72 || 
|-  style="text-align:center; background:#cfc;"
| 68 || March 7 || Edmonton Oilers || 4–1 || Mighty Ducks of Anaheim || || Salo || 15,818 || 29–23–8–8 || 74 || 
|-  style="text-align:center; background:#fbb;"
| 69 || March 10 || Toronto Maple Leafs || 3–2 || Edmonton Oilers || || Salo || 16,839 || 29–24–8–8 || 74 || 
|-  style="text-align:center; background:#cfc;"
| 70 || March 11 || Edmonton Oilers || 5–2 || Calgary Flames || || Salo || 17,714 || 30–24–8–8 || 76 || 
|-  style="text-align:center; background:#fbb;"
| 71 || March 13 || New York Islanders || 5–2 || Edmonton Oilers || || Salo || 16,839 || 30–25–8–8 || 76 || 
|-  style="text-align:center; background:#cfc;"
| 72 || March 15 || Dallas Stars || 3–4 || Edmonton Oilers || || Salo || 16,839 || 31–25–8–8 || 78 || 
|-  style="text-align:center; background:#cfc;"
| 73 || March 17 || Edmonton Oilers || 5–3 || Nashville Predators || || Salo || 15,334 || 32–25–8–8 || 80 || 
|-  style="text-align:center; background:#ffb;"
| 74 || March 20 || Edmonton Oilers || 2–3 || Phoenix Coyotes || OT || Salo || 13,221 || 32–25–8–9 || 81 || 
|-  style="text-align:center; background:#cfc;"
| 75 || March 22 || Washington Capitals || 3–5 || Edmonton Oilers || || Salo || 16,839 || 33–25–8–9 || 83 || 
|-  style="text-align:center; background:#cfc;"
| 76 || March 23 || Nashville Predators || 2–3 || Edmonton Oilers || OT || Salo || 16,839 || 34–25–8–9 || 85 || 
|-  style="text-align:center; background:#cfc;"
| 77 || March 26 || Phoenix Coyotes || 3–4 || Edmonton Oilers || || Salo || 16,839 || 35–25–8–9 || 87 || 
|-  style="text-align:center; background:#cfc;"
| 78 || March 28 || Columbus Blue Jackets || 0–4 || Edmonton Oilers || || Markkanen || 16,839 || 36–25–8–9 || 89 || 
|-  style="text-align:center; background:white;"
| 79 || March 30 || Edmonton Oilers || 4–4 || Chicago Blackhawks || OT || Salo || 14,592 || 36–25–9–9 || 90 || 
|-  style="text-align:center; background:white;"
| 80 || March 31 || Edmonton Oilers || 5–5 || St. Louis Blues || OT || Markkanen || 18,503 || 36–25–10–9 || 91 || 
|-

|-  style="text-align:center; background:white;"
| 81 || April 3 || San Jose Sharks || 3–3 || Edmonton Oilers || OT || Markkanen || 16,839 || 36–25–11–9 || 92 || 
|-  style="text-align:center; background:#fbb;"
| 82 || April 5 || Calgary Flames || 4–1 || Edmonton Oilers || || Salo || 16,839 || 36–26–11–9 || 92 || 
|-

|-
| Legend:

Playoffs

|-  style="text-align:center; background:#cfc;"
| 1 || April 9 || Edmonton Oilers || 2–1 || Dallas Stars || || Salo || 18,532 || 1–0 || 
|-  style="text-align:center; background:#fbb;"
| 2 || April 11 || Edmonton Oilers || 1–6 || Dallas Stars || || Salo || 18,532 || 1–1 || 
|-  style="text-align:center; background:#cfc;"
| 3 || April 13 || Dallas Stars || 2–3 || Edmonton Oilers || || Salo || 16,839 || 2–1 || 
|-  style="text-align:center; background:#fbb;"
| 4 || April 15 || Dallas Stars || 3–1 || Edmonton Oilers || || Salo || 16,839 || 2–2 || 
|-  style="text-align:center; background:#fbb;"
| 5 || April 17 || Edmonton Oilers || 2–5 || Dallas Stars || || Salo || 18,532 || 2–3 || 
|-  style="text-align:center; background:#fbb;"
| 6 || April 19 || Dallas Stars || 3–2 || Edmonton Oilers || || Salo || 16,839 || 2–4 || 
|-

|-
| Legend:

Player statistics

Scoring
 Position abbreviations: C = Centre; D = Defence; G = Goaltender; LW = Left Wing; RW = Right Wing
  = Joined team via a transaction (e.g., trade, waivers, signing) during the season. Stats reflect time with the Oilers only.
  = Left team via a transaction (e.g., trade, waivers, release) during the season. Stats reflect time with the Oilers only.

Goaltending

Awards and records

Awards

Milestones

Transactions
The Oilers were involved in the following transactions from June 14, 2002, the day after the deciding game of the 2002 Stanley Cup Finals, through June 9, 2003, the day of the deciding game of the 2003 Stanley Cup Finals.

Trades

Players acquired

Players lost

Signings

Draft picks

Edmonton's draft picks at the 2002 NHL Entry Draft at the Air Canada Centre in Toronto, Ontario. The Oilers selection of Robin Kovar at 123rd overall in the fourth round was ruled invalid since Kovar wasn’t eligible for the draft.

Notes

References

 National Hockey League Guide & Record Book 2007

Edmonton Oilers season, 2002-03
Edmon
Edmonton Oilers seasons